Saint Asterius of Ostia (d. 3rd century AD) was a martyred priest.  Information on this saint is based on the apocryphal Acts of Saint Callixtus.  According to tradition, he was a priest of Rome who recovered the body of Pope Callixtus I after it had been tossed into a well around 222 AD.  Asterius buried Callixtus' body at night but was arrested for this action by the prefect Alexander and then killed by being thrown off a bridge into the Tiber River.

According to tradition, his body washed up at Ostia and was buried there.

Veneration
Asterius was venerated from at least the 4th or 5th centuries.   A saint with the same name, along with that of his daughter, were translated by Pope Sergius II between 844 and 847 and rest in the Church of San Martino ai Monti on the Esquiline, according to Anastasius the Librarian.  However, the “Bollandists think that this is the body of another Asterius.”

References

223 deaths
Italian Roman Catholic saints
3rd-century Christian martyrs
Year of birth unknown